Men's freestyle 96 kilograms competition at the 2012 Summer Olympics in London, United Kingdom, took place on 12 August at ExCeL London.
This freestyle wrestling competition consisted of a single-elimination tournament, with a repechage used to determine the winners of two bronze medals. The two finalists faced off for gold and silver medals. Each wrestler who lost to one of the two finalists moved into the repechage, culminating in a pair of bronze medal matches featuring the semifinal losers each facing the remaining repechage opponent from their half of the bracket.

Each bout consisted of up to three rounds, lasting two minutes apiece. The wrestler who scored more points in each round was the winner of that rounds; the bout finished when one wrestler had won two rounds (and thus the match).

Schedule
All times are British Summer Time (UTC+01:00)

Results
Legend
R — Retired
WO — Won by walkover

Final

Top half

Bottom half

Repechage

Final standing

References

Page 26

External links
FILA Official Website

Wrestling at the 2012 Summer Olympics
Men's events at the 2012 Summer Olympics